The Silesian Socialist Party (ŚPS) was a political party in Silesia, Poland. The party was founded on May 1, 1928, by Józef Biniszkiewicz. When the new party was founded, it took over the regional PPS organ Robotnik Śląski ('Silesian Worker').

Biniszkiewicz had been the leader of the Polish Socialist Party (PPS) in Upper Silesia, but had been expelled from the party for not supporting the opposition of PPS against the Józef Piłsudski government, and for opposing cooperation with German socialist parties. The ŚPS was seen as pro-Sanacja.

The party, which failed to get a prominent role in Silesian politics, was dissolved in 1930.

References

1928 establishments in Poland
1930 disestablishments in Poland
Defunct socialist parties in Poland
Polish Socialist Party
Political parties disestablished in 1930
Political parties established in 1928
Silesian Voivodeship (1920–1939)p